Hermann Theodor Simon (1 January 1870, in Kirn – 22 December 1918, in Göttingen) was a German physicist.

Biography 
He studied physics at the Universities of Heidelberg and Berlin, earning his doctorate in 1894 under August Kundt with a thesis on the dispersion of ultraviolet radiation. Afterwards, he served as an assistant to Eilhard Wiedemann at Erlangen, obtaining his habilitation in 1896. Two years later, he became an assistant to Eduard Riecke at the University of Göttingen, then relocated to Frankfurt am Main as director of the physics laboratory. In 1901 he returned to Göttingen as an associate professor and director of the department of applied electricity. In 1907 he was appointed as a full professor at the University of Göttingen.

With Eduard Riecke, he was editor of the physics journal Physikalische Zeitschrift.

Selected writings 
 Über Dispersion ultravioletter Strahlen, 1894 - On dispersion of ultraviolet radiation (graduate thesis).
 Über ein neues photographisches Photometrierverfahren und seine Anwendung auf die Photometrie des ultravioletten Spektralgebietes, 1896 - Involving a new photographic photometric method and its application to the photometry of the ultraviolet spectral region.
 Akustische Erscheinungen am electrischen Flammenbogen, 1898 - Acoustic phenomena at the electric flame arc, Ann. Physik, Vol 300, No 2, pp233-242.
 Elektrotechnisches Praktikum des Instituts für Angewandte Elektrizität der Universität Göttingen, 1908 - Electrical engineering internship at the Institute of Applied Electricity, University of Göttingen.
 Der elektrische lichtbogen: experimentalvortrag auf wunsch des wissenschaftlichen vereins zu Berlin gehalten am 11. januar 1911, (1911) - The electric arc: an experimental lecture.

References

External links
 

1870 births
1918 deaths
20th-century German physicists
People from Bad Kreuznach (district)
Academic staff of the University of Göttingen